Leucaena lempirana is a species of plant in the family Fabaceae. It is found only in Honduras.

References

lempirana
Endemic flora of Honduras
Taxonomy articles created by Polbot